Stephen Pope (fl. 1388), of Gloucester, was an English politician.

He was a Member (MP) of the Parliament of England for Gloucester in September 1388.

References

Year of birth missing
Year of death missing
14th-century English people
People from Gloucester
Members of the Parliament of England (pre-1707) for Gloucester